James Bryant (born December 18, 1985) is an American football linebacker who is currently a free agent. He was signed by the Washington Redskins as an undrafted free agent in 2009. He played college football at Louisville.

Early years
Bryant played for Reading High School in Pennsylvania. He rushed for 984 yards as a running back and had 314 tackles on the defense. He also had 18 sacks, 5 interceptions, and 9 fumble recoveries in his high school career.

College career
Bryant played three seasons at Miami (Florida) and appeared in 32 games primarily on offense as a backup fullback from 2004 to 2007. Team's No. 2 fullback who played in all 12 games, making one start...Rushed one time for eight yards and caught two passes for 44 yards...Also returned two kickoffs for 34 yards...Made 15 tackles on special teams (second on the team)...Served as the backup fullback to Quadtrine Hill all season...Returned kickoffs at Florida State (13 yards) and vs. Georgia Tech (21 yards)...Made his only carry of the season vs. Colorado for eight yards...Got his first reception vs. South Florida, a 22-yarder, and added another 22-yarder at Temple...Started the Virginia Tech game.

Highly recruited player who was the backup fullback and a top special teams player in 2005...Switched to linebacker in 2006 and will play as a reserve competing for increased playing time...Versatile athlete who has impressive size and strength...Has exceptional speed and is a tremendous closer in pursuit...Can cover the entire field because of his range...Is a big hitter both on defense and as a blocker on offense, and he loves contact...Has shown the ability to overpower blockers who get in his way...Saw most of his playing time on special teams as a true freshman in 2004...Elementary education major.

Bryant later transferred to Louisville and sat out one year. During his final year of eligibility in 2008, James appeared in 10 games for the Cardinals recording 100 tackles, two interceptions one punt return for 26 yards, one blocked punt and 17 tackles for loss.

Professional career

Washington Redskins
Bryant was signed by the Washington Redskins as an undrafted free agent following the 2009 NFL Draft. He participated in the mini camp and was released.

Boxing
After he was released by the Redskins, Bryant tried professional boxing for a while. He appeared as a heavyweight in 5 boxing matches and has a 4-1 record with 4 knockouts.

The 6-foot-3, 245-pound pure puncher is 2–0, both wins by first-round knockouts in scheduled four-rounders. His next bout is June 15 on the Tuesday Night Fights Live card at the Hard Rock Live.

Bryant won his Feb 16 debut over 244-pound Roy Boykins at the 2-minute mark and his second fight on April 13 over Andrew Maxwell at the 2:19 mark.

Orlando Predators
Bryant signed with the Orlando Predators in 2010 as a defensive end and played three games. In those three games Bryant recorded four sacks, forced 9 interceptions and one kickoff return for a touchdown.

BC Lions
Bryant played for the BC Lions in the CFL during the 2011 season. He was signed in May and was released in October 25. He did not record any offensive or defensive statistics during that time frame

Detroit Lions
The Detroit Lions signed Bryant as a free agent on March 16, 2012. Bryant was released as a part of Lion's last round of cut on August 27, 2012.

New Orleans VooDoo
Bryant played the 2013 season with the New Orleans VooDoo.

Pittsburgh Power
Bryant was assigned to the Pittsburgh Power on October 10, 2013.

Cleveland Gladiators
Bryant was assigned to the Cleveland Gladiators on May 7, 2015.

References

External links
Detroit Lions bio
FB James Bryant simply wants to open up holes for Lions' tailbacks
CFL bio
BoxRec
hurricanesports
jrosports

1985 births
Living people
American football fullbacks
Miami Hurricanes football players
Louisville Cardinals football players
Orlando Predators players
Detroit Lions players
New Orleans VooDoo players
Pittsburgh Power players
Cleveland Gladiators players